Bonnar is a surname. Notable people with the surname include:

 Colm Bonnar (born 1964), Irish former hurling player
 Conal Bonnar (born 1969), Irish hurling player
 Cormac Bonnar (born 1959), Irish hurling player
 Joanne Bonnar, Scottish TV news reporter
 John James Bonnar (1818–1905), headmaster and lawyer in South Australia and New South Wales
 Joseph Bonnar (1948–2017), English rugby league footballer
 Mark Bonnar (born 1968), Scottish actor
 Stephan Bonnar (1977–2022), American mixed martial arts fighter

See also
 Bonar (name)
 Bonner (disambiguation)